Yuri Aleksandrovich Pershin (born 30 June 1986) is a former Russian football player.

Club career
He played two seasons in the Russian Football National League for FC Vityaz Podolsk.

External links
 
 

1986 births
Footballers from Saint Petersburg
Living people
Russian footballers
Association football forwards
FC Zenit-2 Saint Petersburg players
FC Novokuznetsk players
FC Vityaz Podolsk players
FC Dynamo Saint Petersburg players